Izrael Chaim Wilner, nom de guerre "Arie" and "Jurek" (November 14, 1917 – May 8, 1943) was a Jewish resistance fighter during World War II, member of the Jewish Fighting Organization's (ŻOB) leadership, a liaison between ŻOB and the Polish Home Army, a poet, and a participant in the Warsaw Ghetto Uprising.

Early life
Wilner came from a well off family. Before the war he was an active member of the socialist-Zionist movement Hashomer Hatzair.

During the war
After the German invasion of Poland, Wilner, along with several other Jews, hid among the Dominican nuns in Wilno (now Vilnius). There, he met Henryk Grabowski (nom de guerre "Słonina", or "Salo" due to the fact that he ran a meat store), a courier for the Polish Home Army (AK). According to Marek Edelman, Jurek Wilner was the mother superior's favorite because he reminded her of her brother who had been taken by Germans for slave labor. While in hiding, they discussed various issues, including religion and Marxism. It was the mother superior who first called him "Jurek". When he left with Grabowski for Warsaw, Wilner left his most prized possession, a notebook of poems and personal observations with her.

In Warsaw, Jurek Wilner was the ŻOB's representative on the "Aryan side", and the main contact between the organization in the Warsaw ghetto and the Polish resistance, particularly through Henryk Woliński, "Wacław". Grabowski himself was unaware of Jurek's role due to the conspiratorial need to keep information compartmentalized in case of arrest and interrogation by the Gestapo. He learned of it only after the war.

"Wacław" and the AK supplied Wilner with weapons and ammunition, with Jurek and Tosia Altman serving as contact persons. It was Jurek's job to smuggle these back into the ghetto (with help from Wolinski). On occasions when there was too much material to carry in one trip Jurek would hide the remainder at the Carmelite convent on Wolska Street in Warsaw. Grabowski also acquired cyanide for Wilner which the ŻOB fighters wanted to have in case of being captured by the Germans.

In early March 1943 Wilner was arrested by the Gestapo while carrying false documents and arms. The Gestapo did not realize that he was a Jew and rather considered him to be some ranking member of the Polish resistance. He managed to escape at the end of March. He joined a column of prisoners being taken for hard labor to the Grochowo concentration camp, hoping that this way he'd die quicker and thus avoid further interrogation by the Gestapo. However, Grabowski learned from someone that Wilner was in the camp, got himself in by swimming across the surrounding swamp and personally rescued Jurek. 

After Wilner's capture, the role of the courier between ŻOB and AK was taken over by Icchak Cukierman<ref name=os>Oneg Shabbat, Associates of Emanuel Ringelblum, [http://www.archiwa.gov.pl/memory/sub_ringelblum/index.php?fileid=001_3&va_lang=en Pamiec Polski/Memory of Poland] , last accessed August 29, 2010.</ref> and, according to Marek Edelman, Michal Klepfisz.

After his escape from the Gestapo, Wilner recovered with help from Grabowski, who also wanted him to leave Warsaw and hide in the countryside. Wilner refused, however, and when the Warsaw Ghetto Uprising broke out, he left to join it despite the fact that he was not fully recovered.

Before the outbreak of the uprising in the ghetto, Wilner told Woliński, "We do not wish to save our lives. None of us will come out of this alive. We want to save the honor of mankind".

Wilner died in the mass suicide of the leaders of the Jewish resistance on 18 Miła Street at the end of the uprising. According to Tosia Altman, who was present at the event but who managed to escape the ghetto only to be captured by the Germans later, Wilner was the person who urged Mordechai Anielewicz and other members of ŻOB's command to commit mass suicide in the bunker rather than to surrender to the Germans. Altman's version was also in the official report of the Jewish National Committee written in 1944.

He was awarded posthumously by the Polish government with the Virtuti Militari Cross, V class, Poland's highest military decoration for courage in the face of the enemy. In the 2001 television film Uprising, he was portrayed by American actor Eric Lively.

Poetry

Some of Wilner's poems survived the war, as they had been written down in the notebook which he left with the mother superior of the Dominican convent in Wilno. Several of them have been transcribed and published in the book by Hanna Krall, "Shielding the Flame" (Zdążyć przed Panem Bogiem''").

References

1917 births
1943 deaths
Recipients of the Silver Cross of the Virtuti Militari
Warsaw Ghetto Uprising insurgents
People who died in the Warsaw Ghetto
Jewish Combat Organization members
Jewish resistance members during the Holocaust
Hashomer Hatzair members
1943 suicides
People from Warsaw
Suicides by poison
Suicides in Poland